The Duke of Edinburgh Hotel is a 4-star luxury hotel located on Abbey Road in Barrow-in-Furness, England. The building itself was built in 1871 and was granted grade II status in 1976. The hotel was built during a period of great economic growth in Barrow, the town was home to the largest steelworks in the world and one of the most important shipyards in the country. The Duke of Edinburgh Hotel soon became Barrow's most prestigious and attracted dignitaries and celebrities from across the world; some of the more notable examples being Charlie Chaplin, D. H. Lawrence and Cary Grant.

In 2006 The Duke of Edinburgh Hotel was bought by C2 Investment who spent in excess of £2 million renovating the building inside and out. The hotel now includes 42 en-suite bedrooms, the 'Consort Bar and Grill' as well as a 300 capacity function room called the Regency Suite.

See also
 Listed buildings in Barrow-in-Furness

References

Duke of Edinburgh Hotel
Duke of Edinburgh Hotel
Duke of Edinburgh Hotel
Duke of Edinburgh
Grade II listed hotels
1871 establishments in England